Stiffia chyrsantha is a species of flowering plant in the family Asteraceae, endemic to Brazil. It has alternate, entire smooth leaves and reticulate veins. The involucre has 30 to 40 green, imbricated scales with short hairs. Actinomorphic corollas are pale orange below and darker above.

References

Stifftioideae